Shashigupta  was a ruler of Paropamisadae (modern north-west Pakistan and eastern Afghanistan), between the Hindu Kush mountains and Indus Valley during the 4th century BCE. The name Shashigupta is a reconstruction of a hypothetical Indo-Aryan name, based on a figure named in ancient Greek and Roman sources as Sisikottos (Arrian), and Sisocostus (Curtius).

The root shashi is equivalent to chandra ("moon") in Indian languages. Consequently, Shashigupta is often linked to various figures known as Chandragupta in  ancient Indian sources.  Both names mean "moon-protected". However, there is no consensus amongst modern scholars as to which of the historical Chadraguptas, if any, may be identified with Shashigupta.

Identification with figures in Indian sources 

Sisikottos/Sisocostus appears twice in Arrian's Anabasis and once in Historiae Alexendri Magni by Curtius. Many scholars suggest that Shashigupta was a ruler of some frontier hill state south of Hindukush, it is however, more appropriate to call him a military adventurer or a corporation leader coming from the warlike background of the fierce Kshatriya clan of the Ashvakas from Massaga or Aornos (Pir-Sir) or some other adjacent territory of the Ashvakas. No ancient evidence is available which attests Shashigupta's royal background prior to his appointment by Alexander as ruler of the Ashvakas of the Aornos country.

There are at least four schools of thought regarding any connection to one of the Chandraguptas. Some scholars identify him with Chandragupta Maurya, while others say that Chandragupta Maurya was a separate figure with origins in Eastern India and a third school sees Shashigupta and Chandragupta as separate Paropamisadaen figures, both of whom had ties to separate branches of the Ashvakas.

Early life
Nothing is known about early life of Shashigupta. He was presumably a military adventurer, a leader of corporation of professional soldiers (band of mercenary soldiers) whose main goals were economic and military pursuits.

In all probability, Shashigupta was a professional soldier and led a corporation of mercenary soldier to help Persians especially Bessus, the Iranian Satrap of Bactria but once his case was lost, Shashigupta, along with band of warriors (obviously as mercenary soldiers), threw his lot with the invaders and thereafter, rendered a great help to Alexander during latter's campaigns of Sogdiana and later also of the Kunar and Swat valleys.

As the Satrap of the eastern Ashvakas
In May 327 BCE, when Alexander the Great invaded the republican territories of the Alishang/Kunar, Massaga and Aornos on the west of Indus, Shashigupta had rendered great service to the Macedonian invader in reducing several Kshatriya chiefs of the Ashvakas of the Alishang/Kunar and Swat valleys. He appears to have done this in an understanding with Alexander that after the reduction of this territory, he would be made the lord of the country. And Arrian definitively confirms that after the reduction of the fort of Aornos in Swat where the Ashvakas had put up a terrible resistance, Alexander entrusted the command of this extremely strategic fort of Aornos to Shashigupta and made him the Satrap of the surrounding country of the eastern Ashvakas.

Shashigupta vs Meroes, the friend of Porus
Towards the end of battle of Hydaspes (Jhelum), Arrian mentions a certain Meroes and attests him to be an Indian and an old friend of Porus (or Poros). Arrian further attests that he was finally chosen by Alexander to bring the fleeing Porus back for concluding peace treaty with Macedonian invader. It is notable that at the time of Porus's war with Alexander, Shashigupta, the satrap of the eastern Ashvakas had very cordial relations with Porus. In fact, he was on good terms both with Porus as well as Alexander and was finally chosen by Alexander to effect peace negotiations between him (Alexander) and Porus when Taxiles i.e. the ruler of Taxila had failed in this endeavour. It is more than likely, as several scholars have speculated, that Shashigupta may have alternatively been known also as Meroes (equivalent to the Sanskrit Maurya) after his native-land Meros (Mor or Mer in Prakrit, perhaps Mt Meru of Sanskrit texts). Another possibility is that name Meroes (Maurya?) may have been derived from "Mer" (hill or mountain) or "Mera" (hillman) on account of the fact that Sisicottos or Shashigupta was obviously a hilllman or mountaineer.

After the assassination of Nicanor
A few months later when Alexander was still in Punjab and was engaged in war with the Glausais of Ravi/Chenab, the Ashvakas had assassinated Nicanor, the Greek governor of lower Kabul valley and also issued a threat to kill Shashigupta if he continued to cooperate with the invaders. While Phillipos was appointed to Nicanor's place, no further reference to Shashigupta by this name exists in classical sources. It appears likely that as a shrewd politician & statesman cum military general, Shashigupta had sensed the pulse of time and therefore, after deserting Alexander’ camp, he had thrown his lot with the emerging powerful group of insurgents. Thence afterward, Shashigupta seems to appear under an alternative name----Moeres or Moeris of the classical chroniclers. It is notable that Moeres, Moeris, Meris and Meroes are all equivalent terms. Arrian writes Meroes  while Curtius spells it as Moeres or Moeris. Chieftain Moeris of lower Indus delta (Patala) referenced by Curtius seems precisely to be the same person as Meroes of north-west, attested to be old friend of Porus by Arrian. Alexander was apparently annoyed at this development and pursued Shashigupta who appears to have fled with his followers to lower Indus. He probably appears there as Moeres of Curtius, a chief of Patala. It is but natural that after joining the band of insurgents, Shashigupta alias Meroes or Moeres became a leader of the group of rebels and started his struggle for realizing his bigger goals for bigger regal power.

Shashigupta vs Chandragupta

Scholars like Dr H. C. Seth and Dr H. R. Gupta theorize that Shashigupta was another name for Chandragupta Maurya, founder of Maurya Empire, although other scholars appear to have taken this theory lightly.

According to these scholars, it is very conspicuous that Shashigupta (Sisikottos) and Chandragupta (Sandrokotos) both names literally mean "moon-protected". "Shashi" part of Shashigupta has exactly the same meaning in Sanskrit as the "Chandra" part of Chandragupta—both mean "the moon". Thus, the two names are exact synonyms. Scholars say that it is not an uncommon practice in India to substitute one's given name with a synonym. Thus, it appears very likely, as many scholars believe, that Chandragupta may have been an alternative name for Shashigupta and both names essentially refer to same individual. This view is further reinforced if we compare the early lives of Shashigupta and Chandragupta. Both men are equally remarkable, both are military adventurers par excellence, both are rebellious and opportunists, both are equally ambitious, both are far-sighted and shrewd statesmen, and lastly but more importantly, both emerge in history precisely at the same time and at the same place in north-west India. Plutarch's classic statement that Andrakottos had met Alexander in his youth days  probably alludes to the years when Sisikottos had gone to help Iranians against Alexander at Bactria in 329 BCE. J. W. McCrindle concludes from Plutarch's statement that Chandragupta was native of Punjab rather than Magadha. Appian's statement: "And having crossed Indus, Seleucus warred with Androkottos, the king of the Indians, who dwelt about that river (the Indus)"  clearly shows that Chandragupta was initially a ruler of Indus country.  It was only after Chandragupta's war with Seleucus which took place in 305 BCE  and the defeat of the latter that Chandragupta appears to have shifted his capital and residence from north-west to Pataliputra—which was also the political headquarters of the regime he had succeeded to.

Dr Seth concludes: "If Chandragupta is identical to Shashigupta, then we find no difficulty in assuming that he indeed belonged to the Kshatriya clan of the Ashvakas whose influence extended from the Hindukush to eastern Punjab at the time of Alexander's invasion. With Mauryan conquest of other parts of India, these Ashvakas settled in other parts of India as well. From Buddhist literature, we also read of southern Ashvakas (or Assakas or Asmakas) on the bank of river Godavary in Trans-Vindhya country. The Ashvakas are said to have belonged the great Lunar dynasty..... In the region lying between Hindukush and Indus, Alexander received terrible resistance from the Kshatriya tribe called Ashvakas".

Some scholars believe that the insurgency against the Greek rule in north-west had first started probably in lower Indus. If this is true, then Moeris of Patala may indeed have been the pioneer in this revolution and he may be assumed to be the same person as Meroes of north-west i.e. Chandragupta Maurya, alternatively known also as Shashigupta  originally a native of the Swat/Kunar valleys west of Indus. Other scholars like Dr B. M. Barua, Dr H. C. Seth etc. also identify Shashigupta with Chandragupta. As noted above, Dr J. W. McCrindle calls Chandragupta a native of Panjab. American archaeologist David B. Spooner thinks that Chandragupta was an Iranian who had established a dynasty in Magadha. Based on the classical evidence, Dr H. R. Gupta thinks that Chandragupta as well as Shashigupta both belonged to northwest frontiers and both, perhaps belonged to two different sections of the Ashvaka Kshatriyas. Dr Chandra Chakravarti also relates Shashigupta and Chandragupta to northwest frontiers and states that Shashigupta belonged to Malkand whereas Chandragupta Maurya was a ruler of Ujjanaka or Uddyana (Swat) territory of the Ashvakas.

Notes

References
 
Indian Historical Quarterly, vol.8 (1932), B. M. Barua
Indian Culture, vol. X, p. 34, B. M. Barua
The Zoroastrian period of Indian history, (Journal of the Royal Asiatic Society of Great Britain and Ireland, 1915, 1915, (Pt. II), pp 406, 416-17, D.B. Spooner
Invasion India by Alexander the Great, 1896, p 112, 405/408 J. W. McCrindle
 
Was Chandragupta Maurya a Punjabi?, Punjab History Conference, Second Session, October 28-30, 1966, Punjabi University Patiala, p 32-35, Dr H. R. Gupta
They Taught Lessons to Kings, Gur Rattan Pal Singh; Article in Sunday Tribune, January 10, 1999
The Indian Review, 1937, p 814, edited by G. A. Natesan
The Indian Historical Quarterly, 1963, p 361, India
Indian Culture, 1934, p 305, Indian Research Institute- India
Note on Saśigupta and Candragupta, The Indian Historical Quarterly/edited by Narendra Nath Law, Vol. XIII. Articles:, Miscellany,. Reprint. Delhi, Caxton, 1998, 39 Volumes
Ashoka and His Inscriptions, 1968, p 51, Beni Madhab Barua, Ishwar Nath Topa
Paradise of Gods, 1966, p 312, Qamarud Din Ahmed - West Pakistan (Pakistan)
Poisoning of Alexander ( Part 2 ), Newsfinder, 2008, History Section, Dr Ratanjit Pal
Age of Nandas, and Mauryas, 1967, p 427, K. A. Nilakanta Sastri
Maurajya Samarajya Samsakrik Itihasa, 1972, B. P. Panthar
Alexander's Campaigns in Sind and Baluchistan and the Siege of the Brahminabad, 1975, p 26, Pierre Herman Leonard Eggermont
Indological Studies, 1977, p 100, University of Sindh, Institute of Sindology

See also
 Sophagasenus

Indian warriors
4th-century BC Indian people
History of Pakistan